The D.S. Adegbenro ICT Polytechnic is a state government higher education institution located in Ewekoro, Ogun State, Nigeria. The current rector is Kehinde Job-Olatunji.

History 
The D.S. Adegbenro ICT Polytechnic was established in 2006. It was formerly known as Gateway ICT Polytechnic.

Courses 
The institution offers the following courses;

 Statistics
 Electrical/Electronic Engineering Technology
 Computer Science
 Business Administration and Management
 Office Technology And Management
 Agricultural Technology
 Science Laboratory Technology
 Computer Engineering
 Marketing
 Public Administration
 Accountancy

References 

Universities and colleges in Nigeria
2006 establishments in Nigeria